Thomas Hertel (born 1951) is a German composer.

Life 
Hertel was born in Bad Salzungen, Thuringia. After his Abitur in the special branch for music in Wernigerode, Hertel studied musicology in Halle from 1969 to 1973. Afterwards he was a master student for composition at the Academy of Arts, Berlin with Siegfried Matthus. From 1974 to 1982, he was head of incidental music at the Staatsschauspiel Dresden and worked as a freelance composer and head of the Young Composers Section in the Dresden Composers' Association (commissioned operas Leonce and Lena and Till). He received composition prizes in Halle and the Hans Stieber Prize of the Radio of the GDR. After his compositional promotion (among others by the two Leipzig music publishers Peters and Deutscher Verlag für Musik), he was banned from working on and realising cross-genre projects. In 1991, he received the Art Prize of the City of Munich for experimental theatre. He has held teaching posts at music academies and drama schools among others in Hamburg, Bochum, Frankfurt and Munich. He has realised numerous commissioned works, song recitals and theatre music for over 40 German-speaking theatres.

Awards 
 1982: Hans Stieber Prize
 1982: Hanns Eisler Prize
 1991: Kunstpreis der Landeshauptstadt München
 2009: Leipziger Theaterpreis

References

External links 
 
 Thomas Hertel on Nationaltheater Weimar
Thomas Hertel im Archiv Zeitgenössischer Komponisten der Saxon State and University Library Dresden

20th-century German composers
20th-century classical composers
1951 births
Living people
People from Bad Salzungen